Seven Sacrifices (2013) is an album by Greek thrash metal band Memorain. This album is a compilation of old songs the band originally recorded for Digital Crimes (2002) and White Line (2003) and have been rerecorded with the bands' line-up new sound.

Track listing

Personnel 
 Ilias Papadakis – guitars
 Jason Mercury – guitars
 Andreas Boutos – vocals
 Dimitris Anestis – bass
 Tolis Mistiloglou – drums

References

2013 albums
Memorain albums